Kutani Dam is a dam in the Ishikawa Prefecture of Japan.

References

Dams in Ishikawa Prefecture
Dams completed in 2005